Andrey Campos Vargas (born December 7, 1978) is a retired football player born in Costa Rica.

Club career
He played for San Carlos, Pérez Zeledón, Herediano, Santos de Guápiles, Puntarenas, and Cartaginés. He had a spell abroad with Guatemalan side América de Chimaltenango Campos was known as a talented skillful offensive middle fielder with some fine skills for passing, dribbling and shooting. In

International career
He played at the 1995 FIFA U-17 World Championship and 1997 FIFA World Youth Championship, but never played for the senior Costa Rica national football team.

References

External links 
Andrey Campos officially left professional soccer

1978 births
Living people
Association football midfielders
Costa Rican footballers
A.D. San Carlos footballers
Municipal Pérez Zeledón footballers
C.S. Herediano footballers
Santos de Guápiles footballers
Puntarenas F.C. players
Costa Rican expatriate footballers
Expatriate footballers in Guatemala
Costa Rican expatriate sportspeople in Guatemala